Gökbez is a village in Bor district of Niğde Province, Turkey. At  it is situated in the northern slopes of the Toros Mountains. The population of Gökbez was 340 as of 2011.

References 

Villages in Bor District, Niğde